Ficus popenoei is a species of fig found in Latin America, from Brazil and Peru up to Guatemala and Belize.

Subspecies
There are two subspecies:

 Ficus popenoei subsp. malacocarpa Standl. – sometimes considered a separate species, Ficus malacocarpa, which is considered a species of least concern
 Ficus popenoei subsp. popenoi

References

popenoei